KYVZ (106.1 FM) is a radio station licensed to serve the community of Atwood, Kansas. The station is owned by Joseph J. Vyzourek, and airs a classic hits format.

The station was assigned the KYVZ call letters by the Federal Communications Commission on March 14, 2014.

References

External links
Official Website
FCC Public Inspection File for KYVZ

YVZ
Radio stations established in 2016
2016 establishments in Kansas
Classic hits radio stations in the United States
Rawlins County, Kansas